A medium-lift launch vehicle (MLV) is a rocket launch vehicle that is capable of lifting between  by NASA classification or between  by Russian classification of payload into low Earth orbit (LEO). An MLV is between small-lift launch vehicles and heavy-lift launch vehicles.

Rated launch vehicles

Operational

Under development

Retired

Gallery

See also
 Sounding rocket, suborbital launch vehicle
 List of orbital launch systems
 Small-lift launch vehicle, capable of lifting up to 2,000 kg to low Earth orbit
 Heavy lift launch vehicle, capable of lifting between 20,000 and 50,000 kg to low Earth orbit. (Includes Ariane 5)
 Super Heavy lift launch vehicles, capable of lifting more than 50,000 kg (110,000 lb) of payload into LEO
 Comparison of orbital launch systems
 Comparison of orbital rocket engines
 Comparison of space station cargo vehicles
 Rocket

References

Further reading
 Mallove, Eugene F. and Matloff, Gregory L. The Starflight Handbook: A Pioneer's Guide to Interstellar Travel, Wiley. .

Space launch vehicles